John Hume Egerton, Viscount Alford (15 October 1812 – 3 January 1851) was a British Tory Member of Parliament from the Egerton family.

Born John Hume Cust, he was the eldest son of John Cust, 1st Earl Brownlow by his first wife Sophia Hume, daughter of Sir Abraham Hume, 2nd Baronet and Lady Amelia Egerton, great-granddaughter of John Egerton, 3rd Earl of Bridgewater. He gained the courtesy title of Viscount Alford on his father being created an Earl in 1815.  Alford was educated at Eton and Magdalene College, Cambridge. In 1835 he was elected to the House of Commons for Bedfordshire, a seat he held until his death in 1851.

In 1849 Alford assumed by Royal licence the surname of Egerton in lieu of his patronymic, on succeeding to the huge Bridgwater estates through his mother. He joined the Canterbury Association on 17 June 1848 and remained a member until his death.

Lord Alford married Lady Marianne Margaret Compton, daughter of Spencer Compton, 2nd Marquess of Northampton, in 1841. He died in January 1851, aged only 38.  His eldest son, John William Spencer Brownlow Egerton-Cust, succeeded his grandfather in the earldom of Brownlow in 1853. His second son, Adelbert Wellington Brownlow Cust, 3rd Earl Brownlow, later became a government minister.

See also
Duke of Bridgewater
Earl Brownlow

Notes

References 
Kidd, Charles, Williamson, David (editors). Debrett's Peerage and Baronetage (1990 edition). New York: St Martin's Press, 1990,

External links 
 
 

1812 births
1851 deaths
People educated at Eton College
Alumni of Magdalene College, Cambridge
Members of the Parliament of the United Kingdom for English constituencies
UK MPs 1835–1837
UK MPs 1837–1841
UK MPs 1841–1847
UK MPs 1847–1852
Heirs apparent who never acceded
British courtesy viscounts
John
Members of the Canterbury Association
John